The Midlothian Coalfield is a coalfield in southeast Scotland situated immediately to the east and southeast of Edinburgh. It is geologically continuous with the East Fife Coalfield beneath the Firth of Forth though the undersea coal reserves have only been partly exploited. There were undersea workings extending from Prestonlinks Colliery. The sulphur content of the majority of Midlothian coals is less than 1% making it especially suitable for modern requirements.

Geology
The following seams were worked. They are shown in rough stratigraphical order thought not all seams are present throughout the coalfield. Those shown in bold were worked to the greatest extent:

Within the Scottish Coal Measures Group (Middle and Lower Coal Measures):
 Clayknowes Coal
 (Musselburgh) Splint Coal
 (Musselburgh) Rough Coal
 Beefie Coal
 Musselburgh Jewel Coal
 Golden Coal
 Little Splint Coal
 Cowpits Five Foot Coal
 Glass Coal
 Salters Coal
 Musselburgh Nine Foot Coal
 Musselburgh Fifteen Foot Coal
 Pinkie Six Foot Coal
 Musselburgh Seven Foot Coal
 Eskmouth Extra Coal

Within the Upper Limestone Formation:
 South Parrot Coal

Within the Limestone Coal Formation:
 Great Seam Coal
 Gillespie Coal
 Blackchapel Coal
 Kittlepurse Coal
 Peacock Coal
 South Bryans Splint Coal
 Stony Coal
 Ball Coal
 Loanhead No 1 Coal
 Corbie Coals
 Andrews Coal
 South Coal
 North Coal
 Stairhead Coal

Within the Lower Limestone Formation
 North Greens Coal

Within the West Lothian Oil-Shale Formation
 Houston Coal
 various oil-shale horizons

Monktonhall Colliery was abandoned in 1997 and Blinkbonny mine adit was sealed in 2003 so bringing to an end a long history of deep-mining of coal within the coalfield. Opencasting has continued at various sites since then including Blinkbonny, Oxenfoord, Gourlaw and Newbigging Farm.

References 

Coal mining regions in Scotland
Geography of Midlothian